Bishop of Cyprus may refer to

 The Anglican bishop of the Diocese of Cyprus and the Gulf
 The Orthodox Archbishop of Cyprus, see List of archbishops of Cyprus

See also

 Latin Catholic Archdiocese of Nicosia